Ranunculus multifidus, called the common buttercup in South Africa, is a widespread species of flowering plant in the family Ranunculaceae. It is native to SubSaharan Africa (except West Africa), Madagascar, and the Arabian Peninsula. It grows in wet areas. It is used in traditional medicine to treat sores.

References

multifidus
Flora of Nigeria
Flora of West-Central Tropical Africa
Flora of Northeast Tropical Africa
Flora of East Tropical Africa
Flora of South Tropical Africa
Flora of Southern Africa
Flora of Madagascar
Flora of Saudi Arabia
Flora of Yemen
Plants described in 1775